JTG Daugherty Racing (formerly ST Motorsports and JTG Racing) is an American professional stock car racing team that currently competes in the NASCAR Cup Series. The team is owned by former advertising executive Tad Geschickter and his wife Jodi, along with former NBA All-Star center Brad Daugherty. The team currently has a technical alliance with Hendrick Motorsports. JTG Daugherty currently fields the No. 47 Chevrolet Camaro ZL1 in the NASCAR Cup Series full-time for Ricky Stenhouse Jr.

Cup Series

Car No. 37 history
Chris Buescher (2017–2019)

In November 2016, the team announced plans to expand to two cars for the 2017 season. On November 29, Roush Fenway Racing leased their No. 16 charter to JTG, while also loaning driver Chris Buescher to the team. The new car was revealed to be the No. 37 on December 12. During the 2016-17 offseason, it was revealed that the sponsors of the 37 car would be products sold at Kroger stores like Cottonelle, Cheerios, Bush's Baked Beans, Kingsford, and Scott Products. Liberty Tax Service was added as a sponsor on June 2, 2017. In 2018, JTG purchased Furniture Row Racing's No. 77 charter for the No. 37; the charter leased from Roush Fenway Racing was subsequently sold to Team Penske for the No. 12.

Throughout his three-year tenure in the No. 37, Buescher's best finish was 5th at both Daytona races in 2018, and his best points finish was 20th in 2019. On September 25, 2019, it was announced that Buescher will return to Roush Fenway Racing to replace Ricky Stenhouse Jr. in the No. 17 Ford in 2020.

Ryan Preece (2020–2021)

On August 16, 2019, Ryan Preece confirmed he would return to JTG Daugherty Racing for the 2020 season, this time, in the No. 37, with his new teammate Ricky Stenhouse Jr. (who replaced Chris Buescher) in the No. 47 which Preece drove in 2019. Prior to the 2020 Auto Club 400 at Fontana, the No. 37 team was docked 10 owner and driver points and crew chief Trent Owens was suspended for the race after the car was discovered to have an illegal modification during pre-race inspection. Preece struggled mightily throughout the 2020 season, finishing last a total of four times, three of them consecutively. After a violent wreck at Kansas where he walked away unharmed, Preece managed to score two top-10 finishes but ended the season 29th in the standings. For the 2021 season, the 37 would be the only full-time non-chartered team after Spire Motorsports purchased the team's charter. Following the 2021 season, the 37 team was shut down.

Car No. 37 results

Car No. 47 history
In 2006, JTG Racing started a partnership with Wood Brothers Racing to field the No. 21 car under the banner of Wood Brothers/JTG Racing. JTG Daugherty attempted to make their Cup Series debut in the third race of 2007 at Las Vegas Motor Speedway with Ken Schrader behind the wheel of the Ore-Ida Ford, a second car to the Wood Brothers' No. 21, but the team failed to qualify for the race. Jon Wood attempted to qualify the No. 47 in the season's 29th race at Kansas Speedway but also failed to qualify the Little Debbie/Nutty Bars car into the field.

Marcos Ambrose (2008–2010)

With the new ownership at JTG Daugherty Racing in 2008, the team attempted to qualify for the Allstate 400 at the Brickyard with Marcos Ambrose at the wheel and he qualified into the race in 24th position. Ambrose finished in the 22nd position. Ambrose finished 3rd in the No. 21 Ford Fusion of Wood Brothers Racing at the Centurion Boats at the Glen at Watkins Glen International. On October 1, JTG Daugherty signed a deal to enter into a technical alliance with Michael Waltrip Racing for the remainder of 2008 and the 2009 Sprint Cup season. During this technical alliance in 2008 and 2009, the No. 47 ran a Toyota Camry as the third car on the Michael Waltrip Racing team. For the rest of the 2008 season, the 47 switched to Toyota and leased the owner points for MWR's No. 00 entry. Ambrose ran four races for the rest of the season and had the best finish of eighteenth. The 47 became a full-time entry in 2009, running with sponsorship mostly from Little Debbie and the Clorox Company. He had seven top-ten finishes, including a second at Watkins Glen, and finished eighteenth in points. The alliance continued for 2010, with Ambrose again running as the third car for MWR. In 2010, Ambrose had a lower season, statistically speaking, than 2009. His nearest-miss was at Sonoma in June 2010 where he controlled the late stages of the 110-lap race only to be sent to 7th on the final restart after stalling his engine in turn 1 under caution. Ambrose ended up finishing 6th, handing a sure-victory to Jimmie Johnson. Later that season, Ambrose dueled Juan Pablo Montoya for the win at the 2nd road course race of the season, at Watkins Glen, finishing third after leading 8 laps.

Bobby Labonte (2011–2013)

For 2011, however, Ambrose left JTG Daugherty Racing in the Sprint Cup Series to drive for Richard Petty Motorsports although he drove for JTG in a one race deal for Watkins Glen in the Nationwide Series. He was replaced by former series champion Bobby Labonte. Labonte proved a good replacement by scoring 4th in the Daytona 500 and pushing Trevor Bayne to the lead on the final lap. However, the 500 remained their sole high point, and they struggled throughout the season to a 29th-place points finish. As a result, crew chief Frankie Kerr was moved to the shop foreman position, and JTG hired former Richard Childress Racing crew chief Todd Berrier as their new crew chief and general manager. To improve the team's performance beyond MWR, JTG moved back into the Geischeckter's old race shop it shared with the Wood Brothers. However, the team had very few good runs in 2012. For 2013, Labonte and JTG would have the best finish of 15th at Daytona before he was replaced at Kentucky by A. J. Allmendinger. Allmendinger would score a top 10 at Watkins Glen.

A.J. Allmendinger (2013–2018)

On August 29, 2013, Sporting News reported that Allmendinger would be the full-time driver for JTG Daugherty Racing in 2014. The team also would be transitioning to Chevrolet and formed a technical alliance with Richard Childress Racing.

Allmendinger started 2014 slowly but got hot with back to back top-10 finishes in May. He also raced his way into the Sprint All-Star Race. Allmendinger had the strongest car at Sonoma in June but was involved in an incident that left him a disappointing 37th. However, he got redemption at Watkins Glen by winning the race, beating fellow road course ace Marcos Ambrose for the team's first Sprint Cup win. The win was also the first playoff birth for JTG. Ironically, Ambrose himself had nearly scored the team's first win in 2010. Allmendinger ultimately finished 13th in the points standings.

Both Allmendinger and all the team's sponsors returned in 2015. Allmendinger started 2015 off with four straight top-20s, including a pair of top-10s. He also swept both road course poles, at Sonoma and Watkins Glen. However, the team scored only one more top-10, at Pocono in August, and Allmendinger finished 22nd in points. Allmendinger and Kroger inked a multi-year contract extension following the 2015 season.

After starting the 2016 season slowly, the No. 47 picked up momentum with an 8th-place finish at California in the spring. One week later at Martinsville, Allmendinger finished runner-up to Kyle Busch. The team missed the playoffs but closed the season strong picking up six more top-10s and a top-5 at Watkins Glen. Allmendinger finished 19th in points.

In 2017, the team got to a great start, finishing 3rd, nearly winning the Daytona 500. At the first Talladega race, the No. 47 flipped over, while trying to push Chase Elliott late in the race while running again in the top 5.

Ryan Preece (2019)

On September 25, 2018, It was announced that Allmendinger will part ways with JTG Daugherty at the end of the 2018 season. Three days later, it was announced that Ryan Preece would be replacing him as the driver of the No. 47 in 2019. In addition, Preece would compete for 2019 Rookie of the Year honors.

Preece started the 2019 season with an eighth-place finish at the 2019 Daytona 500.

Ricky Stenhouse Jr. (2020–present)

On October 16, 2019, JTG announced Stenhouse would drive for them in 2020. The team later announced that Stenhouse would drive the car with Brian Pattie as the crew chief and moved Preece to the No. 37 car.

Stenhouse got off to a quick start for the team, winning the pole for the 2020 Daytona 500, the first pole for JTG on an oval. He followed up a 20th place finish at Daytona with a strong showing at Las Vegas, leading 30 laps and finishing third. Prior to the 2020 Auto Club 400 at Fontana, the No. 47 team was docked 10 owner and driver points and crew chief Brian Pattie was suspended for the race after the car was discovered to have an illegal modification during pre-race inspection. Stenhouse later finished fourth in the 2020 Alsco Uniforms 500 and followed it up by finishing second at Talladega in a close race. He ended his first season with the team 24th in the standings.

Stenhouse started the 2023 season by winning the 2023 Daytona 500, scoring his third career victory, and second for JTG.

Car No. 47 results

Nationwide Series

Car No. 47 history

Larry Pearson (1996)
The second team in the JTG Daugherty stable made its debut in 1996 at the All Pro Bumper To Bumper 300. The car was No. 46, sponsored by Stanley Tools and driven to a 22nd-place finish by Larry Pearson. Pearson drove two more races for the team that year, each one getting regressively worse.

Robert Pressley (2004)
ST would not run a second car again until 2004, when they fielded the No. 47 Ford Taurus driven by Robert Pressley. Pressley had two top ten finishes that year, and finished 15th in points.

Jon Wood (2005-2007)
Pressley was replaced by rookie Jon Wood in 2005. Wood posted six top-ten finishes and finished 15th in overall championship points. He was to continue to drive the No. 47 car in 2007, before medical problems forced him to exit the ride.

Kelly Bires (2007-2008)
Former American Speed Association champion Kelly Bires took Wood's place for most of the year, garnering two top-ten finishes. Andy Lally took his place on road courses, finishing tenth at Watkins Glen International. Bires drove full-time in 2008.

Michael McDowell (2009)
In 2009, Michael McDowell started the season with sponsorship from Tom's Snacks where he had three top-ten finishes, but left the team midway through the season after Tom's Snacks left the team. The team became a start and park team, listing ConstructionJobs.com as the sponsor (the sponsorship funded only practice and qualifying). Kelly Bires returned for three races followed by Coleman Pressley at Iowa. Marcos Ambrose ran full races with STP sponsorship the two road course events at Watkins Glen and Montreal, and would go on to win the event at Watkins Glen. Pressley and Chase Miller finished out the season. The team was suspended at the end of the year, and its owners points were sold to Penske Racing.

In 2010, the team returned with Ambrose driving two road course races; at Watkins Glen, where he won the race, and at Montreal where he did not finish the race, due to electrical problems.

Car No. 59 history

Jeff Fuller (1995-1997) and Robert Pressley (1997-1998)
JTG Daugherty Racing (then known as ST Motorsports and owned by Tad Geschickter and crew chief Steve Plattenberger) made its debut at the 1995 Goody's 300. Jeff Fuller drove the Sunoco-sponsored Chevrolet to an eleventh-place finish. Fuller ran the full season with ST, and had six top-ten finishes en route to a tenth-place finish in points. He was named Rookie of the Year for the Busch Series that year. Fuller returned again in 1996. While he dropped seven points in the standings due to missing two races, he had four top-ten finishes and won from the pole at the Food City 250. Fuller was 18th in points after the 1997 GM Goodwrench/Delco Batteries 200, when he was released from the ride and replaced by Robert Pressley. Pressley had two-top fives and finished 32nd in points despite missing half the season. Pressley could run only half the season in the newly renumbered No. 59 due to Winston Cup commitments with Jasper Motorsports. He ran 18 races and had two pole positions, finishing 31st in points with sponsorship from Kingsford. Jimmie Johnson, Kevin Lepage, Ron Hornaday Jr. and Rich Bickle filled in when Pressley was unavailable. Adam Petty drove a second car for the team, the No. 22 Spree Chevy in three races during the season and his best finish was 27th (twice).

Mike Dillon (1999)
For 1999, ST hired Mike Dillon as its new driver. Dillon had a seventh-place finish at the Lysol 200 and finished 16th in points that year.

Phil Parsons (2000) and Rich Bickle (2001)
Dillon left for Richard Childress Racing after the season was over and ST replaced him with Phil Parsons. Parsons qualified for all 32 races, had two top-tens and finished 12th in points. In 2001, he was replaced by Bickle again. However, Bickle struggled in the ride and was replaced by Mark Green and Jeff Purvis after the MBNA.com 200.

Stacy Compton (2002-2006)
In 2002, ST hired Stacy Compton to drive the No. 59, and he remained in the car until the end of the 2006 season. His best finish was 2nd four times, and the best points position was 9th in 2002. The only major change from 2002 until 2007 was the team's switch to the Ford Motor Company in 2004.

Marcos Ambrose (2007-2008)
Australian driver Marcos Ambrose was hired to compete in the No. 59 during the 2007 season, finishing in the top-ten six times and ending the year sixth in points.

Ambrose won the team's first race in 2008 running an STP-sponsored No. 59 at Watkins Glen. For the 2009 Nationwide Series, the No. 59 team ceased operations, running only the No. 47 entry for numerous drivers, and the owner points going to the No. 12 Penske Dodge driven by Justin Allgaier.

Craftsman Truck Series

The No. 20 truck debuted in 2006 at the GM Flex Fuel 250 as itself, in a partnership with Wood Brothers Racing. Jon Wood drove the truck for two races, due to Marcos Ambrose not being cleared to run the first two races due to limited experience. Bobby East ran the event at Atlanta. Ambrose finally took over the ride at Martinsville, winning one pole and posting two third-place finishes during the season. In 2007, the truck switched numbers to No. 09. Joey Clanton brought Zaxby's as a sponsor and would share the ride with ex-Busch Series veteran Stacy Compton. Clanton, despite running a partial schedule, was third in the Rookie of the Year standings. Clanton would take both the No. 09 and Zaxby's with him to Roush Fenway Racing for 2008, allowing JTG Daugherty to switch back to the No. 20 and hire Scott Lagasse Jr. as their new driver. After eight races, JTG Daugherty closed its Truck team due to a lack of funding.

Sponsorship 
JTG Daugherty Racing has maintained long-term relationships with sponsors Clorox and Kingsford and their associated company since their time in the Busch series, and the two often appear on the decklid of the car even in races they are not the primary sponsor. The team has also maintained good relations with Bush's Baked Beans and more recent partners Kroger, Kimberly-Clark (Kleenex, Scott Products, Viva) and Charter Communications through several driver and manufacturer changes, and have been able to attract new sponsors every season.

References

External links 
Official Website
Tad Geshickter Owner Statistics
JTG-Daugherty Racing Owner Statistics

1995 establishments in the United States
American auto racing teams
Companies based in North Carolina
NASCAR teams